Jaysh Ahl al-Sunnah wa-l-Jamaah was an Iraqi Salafi insurgent group that fought against US troops and their local allies during the Iraq War. In 2006 the group aligned itself with al-Qaeda and helped establish the Mujahideen Shura Council.

History
Following the US invasion of Iraq, Baghdadi, along with some associates, created Jamaat Jaysh Ahl al-Sunnah wa-l-Jamaah (JJASJ) – the Army of the Sunni People Group – and it operated in Samarra, Diyala, and Baghdad.

Abu Bakr al-Baghdadi served as head of the group and led it to establish caliphate.

On January 15, 2006, an organization known as the Mujahideen Shura Council in Iraq announced its establishment. Jaysh Ahl al-Sunnah wa-l-Jamaah has been declared one of its constituent groups, along with al-Qaeda in Iraq, the Monotheism Brigades, the Sarai al-Jihad group, the al-Ghurab Brigades and the al-Ahwal Brigades.

The dissolution of the 'Jaysh Ahl al-Sunna wa al-Jama'a' group occurred after the announcement of the rise of the 'Islamic State of Iraq' just like the rest of the groups of the 'Majlis Shura Mujahideen al-Iraq', and Abu Bakr became one of the fighters under command of Abu Omar al-Baghdadi, and he assumed in that time a number of responsibilities among them amirship of the Shari'i committees in the Islamic State.

See also
List of armed groups in the Iraqi Civil War
Al-Qaeda in Iraq
Iraqi insurgency

References

Factions in the Iraq War
Groups affiliated with al-Qaeda
Iraq War
Guerrilla organizations
Rebel groups in Iraq
Paramilitary organizations based in Iraq
2004 establishments in Iraq
2006 disestablishments in Iraq
Anti-Shi'ism